Thanjavur Junction (station code: TJ) is a junction railway station in Thanjavur district in the Indian state of Tamil Nadu and serves Thanjavur, earlier known as Tanjore.

History
Thanjavur is located on the "main line" of the railway system in the Coromandel coast connecting Chennai with Tiruchirappalli via Villupuram, Cuddalore, Mayiladuthurai (Mayavaram) and Thanjavur junctions.
In 1861 the Great Southern of India Railway (GSIR) built the -long  broad gauge line between Nagapattinam and Tiruchirapalli (then known as Trichinopoly) and the line was opened to traffic next year. It was a new development south of Chennai. After taking over of GSIR by South Indian Railway Company in 1874, the Nagapattinam–Tiruchirapalli line was converted to -wide metre gauge  in 1875.

The South India Railway Company laid a -long metre gauge trunk line from Chennai to Tuticorin via Mayiladuthurai, Kumbakonam and Thanjavur in 1880.

Three rail lines branch for Thanjavur Junction:
 Towards north for Kumbakonam junction.

Accident
On 8-1-1958 at about 6:25 hours while backing No. 101 Madras-Egmore–Dhanushkodi Boat Mail on the platform line of Tanjore Junction, its rear portion bumped  against the rear portion of No 112  Tenkasi Passenger which was standing on the other end of this platform, having been received earlier.

Gauge conversion
The Cuddalore Port–Vadalur sector was converted in 2003. After conversion work of the Thanjavur–Tiruvarur broad-gauge section was opened to traffic in 2006 and Tiruvarur–Nagore section in 2010.

Electrification
New electrification survey in 2012–13 had been sanctioned in the Railway budget for the Karaikkal/Karaikkal Port–Nagapattinam-Thiruvarur-Needamangalam-Thanjavur–Tiruchirappalli and Nagapattinam–Velankanni sectors. The Electrification of Tiruchirappalli-Thanjavur-Kumbakonam-Mayiladuthurai section was completed in the end of 2020 and it was commissioned on 14th February 2021.

Important trains
Some important trains originating and passing through Thanjavur Junction are
 Uzhavan Express from Thanjavur Junction to Chennai Egmore
 Boat Mail Express from Rameswaram to Chennai Egmore
 Chendur Express from Tiruchendur to Chennai Egmore
 Tambaram–Nagercoil Antyodaya Express
 Cholan Superfast Express from Trichchirapalli Junction to Chennai Egmore
 Mahal Superfast Express from Madurai Junction to Chennai Egmore (Bi-weekly)
 Chemmozhi Express from Mannargudi to Coimbatore Junction
 Tea Garden Express from Karaikal to Ernakulam Junction
 Mysore–Mayiladuthurai Express
 Mayiladuthurai–Coimbatore Jan Shatabdi Express

References

External links
 
 

Railway stations in Thanjavur district
Trichy railway division
Railway junction stations in Tamil Nadu